Suellacabras is a small Spanish town and municipality, located in the province of Soria, part of the autonomous community of Castile and León.

The most important attraction is the church of San Caprasio.

In the municipality is included the village El Espino, with the romanesque church of San Benito and two hermitages: Virgen del Espinar and San Román (gothic, ruins).

References

Municipalities in the Province of Soria